Tyler Blackwood (born 24 July 1991) is an English professional footballer who plays as a striker.

Club career

Youth and college
Born in London, the former Northampton Town trainee moved to the United States to play college soccer at the University of Tampa. Blackwood played three seasons for the Spartans, scoring 24 goals and 8 assists in his 33 appearances. He did not see any action in his first collegiate season. Blackwood also received both the player of the year and offensive player of the year award two years running, breaking several records at the university.

Whilst at the University Of Tampa, Blackwood also took part in the summer PDL league for Orlando City U-23. He went on to score 15 goals in 14 games for the Lions, finishing #1 in the nation in goals.

For his final year of collegiate eligibility Blackwood transferred to nearby NCAA Division 1 school University of South Florida. Blackwood played 18 games for the Bulls, scoring 4 goals and making 3 assists.

Blackwood was overlooked for the 2015 MLS draft, and returned to England and earned a trial at Queens Park Rangers. He successfully impressed during his trial, and signed his first professional deal with QPR.

Queens Park Rangers
After impressing during a trial, on 10 July 2015 Blackwood signed a one-year deal starting from 1 August 2015 with Queens Park Rangers. Blackwood scored six goals in total during his first spell with Rangers at the tail end of the previous 2014–15 season, before signing for the club, including a match-winning brace for the Under-21s at Crewe Alexandra and another double in a first team friendly with Norwich City.
 
On 12 August 2015 Blackwood made his professional debut in Queens Park Rangers 0–3 win over Yeovil Town in the first round of the 2015–16 Football League Cup as a substitute replacing Matt Phillips in the 70th minute at Huish Park.

Newport County (loan)
On 24 September 2015 Blackwood joined League Two club Newport County on a one-month loan. He made his debut for Newport on 26 September as a 60th-minute substitute in a match against Carlisle United. In the 68th minute Blackwood scored a headed goal and Newport went on to win the match 1–0.

Arizona United 
On March 18, 2016, it was announced that Blackwood would be joining USL Championship side Arizona United for the 2016 season.

Sacramento Republic 
On November 29, 2016, Blackwood signed with USL Championship side Sacramento Republic FC for the 2017 season.

Swope Park Rangers 
In February 2018, Blackwood signed with Swope Park Rangers for the 2018 season.

Return to Sacramento Republic 
Blackwood returned to Sacramento for the 2019 season.

St. Louis FC 
On August 14, 2019, it was announced that Blackwood would join St. Louis FC for the remainder of the season.

Oakland Roots SC 
On March 11, 2021, Blackwood signed for USL Championship side Oakland Roots SC.

Career statistics

References

External links

1991 births
Living people
English footballers
English expatriate footballers
University of Tampa alumni
Tampa Spartans men's soccer players
University of South Florida alumni
South Florida Bulls men's soccer players
Orlando City U-23 players
Queens Park Rangers F.C. players
Newport County A.F.C. players
Northampton Town F.C. players
Barnet F.C. players
USL League Two players
English Football League players
Expatriate soccer players in the United States
Phoenix Rising FC players
Sacramento Republic FC players
USL Championship players
Sporting Kansas City II players
Saint Louis FC players
Oakland Roots SC players
Association football forwards
English expatriate sportspeople in the United States